KKLX (96.1 FM) is a radio station broadcasting a hot adult contemporary format. Licensed to Worland, Wyoming, United States, the station is currently owned by the Big Horn Radio Network, a division of Legend Communications of Wyoming, LLC, and features programming from NBC News Radio, and Westwood One.

KWOR, KVGL and KKLX studios are located at 1340 Radio Drive, Worland. KKLX's transmitter site is on Rattlesnake Ridge Road, northeast of Worland.

History
KENB-FM signed on December 1, 1980.
It was owned by and named for Ken Brown, the original owner. On August 20, 1987, the station changed its call sign to KWOR-FM. On October 16, 1989, the station became the current KKLX.

References

External links

KLX
Hot adult contemporary radio stations in the United States
Radio stations established in 1980
1980 establishments in Wyoming
Worland, Wyoming